WYKB (105.3 FM) is a Spanish rhythmic radio station licensed to Fernandina Beach, Florida that serves the Jacksonville, Florida area. It is owned by Norberto Sanchez's Norsan Media.

History

WYKB broadcast a classic country format from October 15, 2013 until May 26, 2014. Prior to that, it used to broadcast a musica tropical format with emphasis toward Salsa and Reggaeton until August 5, 2013, when it flipped to a short-lived classic hits format. By April 2015, the then-WJSJ went silent. On November 2, 2015, WJSJ returned to the air with sports, with programming from CBS Sports Radio.

On July 1, 2016, WJSJ dropped the CBS Sports Radio format and began stunting. On July 18, 2016, WJSJ launched a classic dance format, branded as "DJ 105.3". The station changed its call sign to WZDJ on July 20, 2016, where afterwards, WZDJ began adding more current music from the Rhythmic and Dance genres, with the recurrents receiving less airplay. During this tenure, it was in the middle of being purchased through a LMA from veteran radio programmer Tony Quarterone for $1.3 million.

On December 31, 2016, WZDJ signed off the air due to a lack of advertising support and financial issues, which included the collapse of the sale of the station. The station left a message on its Facebook page that signaled the end of the format and its website and stream were deleted. On January 2, 2017, the station flipped to a simulcast of country-formatted WKBX under the original ownership for the time being. On January 13, 2017, WZDJ changed its callsign to WYKB.

On October 16, 2017, WYKB split from its simulcast with WKBX and changed its format to classic country, branded as "Jax Country 105.3". In January 2020, WYKB became "Jacksonville's JAX 105.3", keeping the classic country format, but with no commercials.

In July 2021, the station switched to a Spanish rhythmic format as "Flow 105.3." Among its core artists are Daddy Yankee, Karol G, Maluma, Ozuna, J Balvin, Bad Bunny, Anitta, Nicky Jam, Natti Natasha and Wisin y Yandel.

WYKB-HD2
On August 4, 2021, WYKB launched a Spanish adult contemporary format on its HD2 subchannel, branded as "Azul 105.3 HD2".

References

External links

2000 establishments in Florida
Nassau County, Florida
Radio stations established in 2000
YKB
Latin rhythmic radio stations
Spanish-language radio stations in Florida
Rhythmic contemporary radio stations in the United States